Phyllonorycter pseuditeina is a moth of the family Gracillariidae. It is native to Nepal.

The wingspan is 5-5.2 mm.

The larvae feed on an undetermined shrub. They mine the leaves of their host plant. The mine has the form of a rather small, tentiformed occurring upon the lower surface of the leaf, always situated on the space between two lateral veins. The lower epidermis of the leaf on the mining part whitish, very much wrinkled longitudinally, while without any distinct ridges even in fully developed condition.

References

pseuditeina
Moths of Asia
Moths described in 1973